Miss World America 1978 was the 1st edition of the Miss World America pageant and it was held in Von Barun Civic Center in Huntsville, Alabama and was won by Debra Jean Freeze of North Carolina. She was crowned by outgoing titleholder, Cindy Darlene Miller of Virginia. Freeze went on to represent the United States at the Miss World 1978 Pageant in London later that year. She finished in the Top 15 at Miss World.

Results

Placements

Special awards

Delegates
The Miss World America 1978 delegates were:

 Alabama - Cheryl Clements
 Alaska - Gay Nel Wilson
 Arizona - Karen Filipi
 Arkansas - Terry Williams
 California - Linda Howerton
 Colorado - Lynelle Gaye Lichtenheld
 Connecticut - Cynthia Lee Leddy
 Delaware - Annette Malgieri
 District of Columbia - Gloria Renfrow
 Florida -  Lynn Hafter
 Georgia - Jane Carol Sapp
 Hawaii - Sharon Bush
 Idaho - Rozalynn Johnson
 Illinois - Barbara Figarola
 Indiana - Lee Ann Miller
 Iowa - Melinda McVey
 Kansas - Cathleen Reardon
 Kentucky - Janet Bishop
 Louisiana - Elberta McKnight
 Maine - Cynthia R. Towne
 Maryland - Celeste Woschke
 Massachusetts - Debra Sue Maurice
 Michigan - Denise Noffsinger 
 Minnesota - Debra J. Peterson
 Mississippi - Judy Bickerstaff
 Missouri - Linda Camacho
 Montana - Mea Townsend
 Nebraska - Rebecca Kunz
 Nevada - Deborah Gabinetti
 New Hampshire - Theresa Tucker
 New Jersey - Dezra Atkinson
 New Mexico - Kathy Killebrew
 New York - Kathleen Peartree
 North Carolina - Debra Jean Freeze
 North Dakota - Cheryl Henry
 Ohio - Lesa Rummell
 Oklahoma - Robin Keene
 Oregon - Tena Montoya
 Pennsylvania - Bonnie Barney
 Rhode Island - Donna Delfino
 South Carolina - Cynthia Wynn
 South Dakota - Lu Ann Keehn
 Tennessee - Paulette Wheelock
 Texas - Debbie Elaine Palmer
 Utah - Heather Walker
 Vermont - Ann Kent
 Virginia - Debbie Walker
 Washington - Ivy Lynn Reed
 West Virginia - Beverly Michael
 Wisconsin - Elizabeth A. Ruyak
 Wyoming - Kim Lisco

Crossovers
Contestants who competed in other beauty pageants:

Miss USA
1977: : Lesa Rummell
1977: : Ann Kent
1977: : Ivy Lynn Reed
1980: : Debra Sue Maurice (as )

Miss World America
1980: : Gay Nel Wilson

References

External links
Miss World Official Website
Miss World America Official Website

1978 in the United States
World America
1978
1978 in Alabama